David Rennie (born 29 August 1964) is a Scottish former professional footballer who played as a defender or defensive midfielder, notably for Leeds United, Bristol City and in the Premier League for Coventry City.

Playing career
He made more than 400 appearances in the Football League, playing for Leicester City, Leeds United, Bristol City, Birmingham City, Coventry City, Northampton Town and Peterborough United.

Personal life
Since retiring, Rennie has worked for a company supplying employment law and health and safety services.

Honours
Northampton Town
Football League Third Division play-offs: 1997

References

External links

1964 births
Living people
Footballers from Edinburgh
Scottish footballers
Association football midfielders
Association football defenders
Leicester City F.C. players
Leeds United F.C. players
Bristol City F.C. players
Birmingham City F.C. players
Coventry City F.C. players
Northampton Town F.C. players
Peterborough United F.C. players
Boston United F.C. players
Burton Albion F.C. players
Premier League players
English Football League players
National League (English football) players
People educated at Ainslie Park High School